Ryongsong Residence, also called Residence No. 55 is a presidential palace in North Korea and the main residence of supreme leader Kim Jong-un and first lady Ri Sol-ju.

Location
According to Kim Jong-il's former bodyguard Lee Young-Guk, there are at least eight North Korean leaders' residences outside Pyongyang.

Description
The compound was constructed by a Korean People's Army construction brigade and completed in 1983 under the rule of Kim Il-sung. It was later used by Kim Jong-il, his sister Kim Kyong-hui and his brother-in-law Jang Sung-taek. Since he succeeded his father as leader of North Korea, Kim Jong-un has used Ryongsong Residence as his main residence. The complex has an underground wartime headquarters, protected with walls with iron rods and concrete covered with lead in case of a nuclear war. There are numerous military units to protect the headquarters stationed around the complex in possession of mass scale conventional weapons. The area is surrounded by an electric fence, mine fields and many security checkpoints. The headquarters is connected with Changgyong Residence (Residence No. 26) and other residences with tunnels. A private underground train station is also inside the residence compound. Besides large houses and well-tended gardens there are man-made lakes and various recreational facilities. Witnesses have reported luxurious interiors with ornate furnishings, deep plush carpets and fancy chandeliers.

Facilities
Facilities of the residence are as follows:

 Banquet halls at the lakefront
 Running track and athletic field
 Spa and sauna
 Horse stables and riding area
 Shooting range
 Horse racing track

See also

 North Korean leader's residences
 Official residence
 Kangdong Residence
 Sinuiju North Korean Leader's Residence
 North Korea Uncovered

References

External links
  – Detailed satellite pictures of six North Korean leader’s residences

 
Buildings and structures in Pyongyang
Official residences
Kim dynasty (North Korea)
1983 establishments in North Korea
20th-century architecture in North Korea